Sebastián Ángel Longo (born 27 May 1983 in San Rafael, Mendoza) is a football Argentina who plays in the position of midfielder. His current team is Atlético Tucumán contesting the First National B in Argentina.

Career 
Began in Lujan de Cuyo at age 16 years where juice became 25 games and 12 goals in one year, was transferred to Gimnasia (M ).
In Gym from the right side in which he did very well making juice 25 games 8 goals in the league being named best young player in the league I feature. I get an offer of 1 million and a half to the club by Sheba and was signed by Aldosivi (MoP) of the first National B.
In the juice Tiburon only 18 games at right end and 2 goals which became the club opted to rescind the contract and am free one year until ficho by Homeless (SJ) in Torneo Argentino A figure which was playing 25 matches and 15 goals by becoming reach semifinal where they lost to Atlético Tucumán.
Returned to the club he loves (Lujan de Cuyo) to achieve the much coveted promotion thing that I do not make the regular season for the club and became juice 23 games 5 goals in the semifinal mentioned with Atlético Tucumán President dkano I highlight as a player for the first national first division and b  which he was very interested and decided to buy it for 900.00 pesos.
With Atletico I started having a regular season but became 5 goals in the first round where he was key on the left side . In the second wheel became 3 goals and the last one against his former club Homeless (SJ), achieved the ascent which gave 3 assists (1 in the first leg and 2 in the back) making the dkno again after 6 years of the first National B. In his second season with the club tucumano achieved the first ascent in the second round where he became the goal that gave the Olympic athletic back for the first time in the National B (juice 32 games and made 3 goals). In his last season with the dkano (2010) achievement playing 28 games and convert 2 goals (Chacarita and gymnastics) I fail to remain in first and opted to step aside being very well with people Atletico Tucuman.
Olympus opted to go but only played 10 games in 1 year and wanted to return to forward tucumano club.
When I returned to Tucuman club was well received and formed part of which went champion in the first round but its performance under and atletico lost the possibility of returning to first juice 23 games 2 goals (the most remembered centrally in which atletico win 2 to 1). After losing this opportunity opted to go for allegedly failing team in Tucuman and surprising his family decided to go independent of Mendoza.
Independent little or no juice made 32 games 3 goals and ended with the whistling of his team and decided to return for the third time atletico.
In its third cycle juice 15 games and 1 goal became in the summer to San Martin de Tucuman.

Teams

References 
 

Sportspeople from Mendoza, Argentina
Atlético Tucumán footballers
Olimpo footballers
Independiente Rivadavia footballers
Argentine footballers
Living people
1983 births
Association football midfielders